Moodgadget is an independent electronic music label with the mission of exposing the diversity in electronically made music. Founded in 2004 in Ann Arbor, Michigan by Jakub Alexander and Adam E. Hunt, the label began as an effort to popularize the founders' opinion that electronic music is a process, not a genre; within its walls live a diverse range of sounds, which would be documented over the course of the label's development.

The label is based in Brooklyn, New York, with Jakub and Adam sharing label management duties. Alexander handles A+R and Hunt serves as the mastering engineer and web designer. Design and artwork are provided by Alex Koplin, who joined the label in 2008. Design contributors include PhilistineDSGN, Adam E. Hunt, Jakub Alexander, Martyna Alexander, Ben Saginaw and Taro Yumiba.

Artists 
The following artists are or have been affiliated with Moodgadget.

Benoît Pioulard
Beacon
Boreal Network
Brael
Casino Versus Japan
Charles Trees
D. Gookin
Direwires
Dykehouse
Foxes in Fiction
Frank Omura
Isomer Transition
JDSY
Khonnor
Kyle Bobby Dunn
Kyson
Machinedrum
Mogi Grumbles
Mux Mool
New Villager
Nitemoves
Praveen
The Reflecting Skin
Seth Troxler
Shigeto
Small Sails
Wisp

Releases

Compilations

In 2006, Moodgadget released "The Rorschach Suite", a 20-song compilation. It reached #17 in iTunes electronic music section, and the single "Lost and Found" by Mux Mool was selected for the "Best of iTunes 2006." In 2008, Moodgadget released two compilations, "The Synchronicity Suite" and "No New Enemies Vol. 1" both made it into the top 30 in iTunes' electronic music section.

Limited and premiere

The label has made use of the donation sales method popularized by Radiohead for their Limited and Premiere releases. Limited releases are those by established artists, and Premiere releases are those by new artists; both allow the customer to choose their own price.

Distribution 

Moodgadet are partnered with The Orchard for distribution through online music retailers, including: iTunes, Amazon and Beatport. They have also utilized the controversial technology BitTorrent, and it is their opinion that music is increasingly becoming a promotional tool for touring, merchandising and licensing.

Licensing 

Moodgadget has licensed music through Jeremy Peters and GHO (a subsidiary of Ghostly International) to LG, and Prada.

External links
 Official website
 

American independent record labels
Electronic music record labels
Record labels established in 2004
Music of Ann Arbor, Michigan
Companies based in New York City
2004 establishments in the United States